Adeem may refer to;

 Abdul-Adeem Karjimi, Moroccan footballer
 Adeem (rapper), American hip-hop artist
 Adeem Investment, a Kuwaiti investment company
 Adeem Hashmi, (1946-2001) Pakistani poet
Adeem the Artist (1988-), American country music singer

See also
 Abdul Azim or Abdul Adeem
 El Hob El Adeem, Fadel Shaker album